The 1970–71 Liga Bet season saw Hapoel Migdal HaEmek, Hapoel Kiryat Haim, Maccabi Bat Yam and Hapoel Ashdod win their regional divisions and promoted to Liga Alef.

North Division A

North Division B

Beitar Tirat HaCarmel withdrew from the league.

South Division A

South Division B

References
Liga Bet Maariv, 31.5.71, Historical Jewish Press 
Bet Leagues Davar, 7.6.71, Historical Jewish Press 
The goal that cloned Kiryat Tiv'on's fate Davar, 14.6.71, Historical Jewish Press 
Lack of "wheeler-dealers" brought Rehovot-Ashdod merging Maariv, 31.8.70, Historical Jewish Press 

Liga Bet seasons
Israel
3